Reynier Mena Berenguer (born 21 November 1996) is a Cuban sprinter. He competed in the 200 metres at the 2015 World Championships and 2016 Olympics.

On 3 July 2022, Mena set massive personal bests in both the 100 metres, joining the sub-10-second club with a 9.99, and in the 200 metres with a 19.63 that suddenly made him into the #10 performers of all time.

International competitions

Personal bests
Outdoor
100 metres – 9.99 (+1.6 m/s) in La Chaux-de-Fonds on 3 July 2022
200 metres – 19.63 (+1.2 m/s) in La Chaux-de-Fonds on 3 July 2022
400 metres – 47.69 in Havana on 7 February 2014

References

External links

1996 births
Living people
Cuban male sprinters
World Athletics Championships athletes for Cuba
Athletes (track and field) at the 2015 Pan American Games
Athletes (track and field) at the 2019 Pan American Games
Pan American Games competitors for Cuba
Athletes from Havana
Athletes (track and field) at the 2016 Summer Olympics
Olympic athletes of Cuba
Central American and Caribbean Games gold medalists for Cuba
Competitors at the 2014 Central American and Caribbean Games
Competitors at the 2018 Central American and Caribbean Games
Central American and Caribbean Games medalists in athletics
20th-century Cuban people
21st-century Cuban people